The 2022 Arizona elections were held in the state of Arizona on November 8, 2022, coinciding with the nationwide general election. All six executive offices were up for election, as well as a U.S. Senate seat, all of the state's U.S. House of Representatives seats, and the state legislature.

In recent years, Arizona's status as a Republican stronghold has significantly weakened; since 2018, Democratic candidates have made substantial gains in the state's legislature, congressional delegation, and statewide executive offices. Going into the 2022 midterm elections, Arizona was considered a crucial swing state.

Primary elections in Arizona took place on August 2. The November general election had mixed results for both parties. The Republican Party picked up two of the five Democratic-held seats in the U.S. House of Representatives, the office of Superintendent of Public Instruction, and an additional seat on the Arizona Corporation Commission, while the Democrats held on to the state's Class 3 U.S. Senate seat, flipped the governorship, and flipped the Attorney General's office.

Lawsuits contesting the election results were filed by the Republican candidates for governor, secretary of state, and attorney general, but the Arizona Superior Court ruled against the Republican candidates.

United States Senate 

Incumbent Democratic U.S. Senator Mark Kelly was first elected in the 2020 special election with 51.2% of the vote. Kelly ran for a full-term in office and won the Democratic primary unopposed.

Blake Masters, former president of the Thiel Foundation and former chief operating officer of Thiel Capital, was the Republican nominee after defeating Arizona Attorney General Mark Brnovich, businessman Jim Lamon, retired Air Force Major General Mick McGuire, and Arizona Corporation Commission member Justin Olson.

The Libertarian Party nominated Marc Victor, an attorney and the party's nominee for U.S. Senate in 2012. Victor withdrew from the race and endorsed Masters on November 1, 2022.

Results 
Incumbent Senator Mark Kelly won reelection with 51.4% of the vote. Blake Masters has conceded his election loss.

United States House of Representatives 

Arizona has nine seats to the United States House of Representatives which are currently held by five Democrats and four Republicans.

Governor 

Incumbent Republican Governor Doug Ducey was term-limited by the Arizona Constitution in 2022 and unable to seek re-election. He was re-elected in 2018 with 56.0% of the vote.

News anchor Kari Lake defeated Arizona Board of Regents member Karrin Taylor Robson in the Republican primary. In the Democratic primary, Secretary of State Katie Hobbs defeated former CBP official Marco A. López Jr.

Hobbs narrowly defeated Lake with 50.3% of the vote.

Results

Secretary of State 

Incumbent Democratic Secretary of State Katie Hobbs retired to run for governor. She was first elected in 2018 with 50.4% of the vote.

In the Democratic primary, former Maricopa County recorder Adrian Fontes defeated state representative Reginald Bolding. Republican state senator Mark Finchem defeated fellow state legislators Shawnna Bolick, Michelle Ugenti-Rita and advertising executive Beau Lane for the nomination.

Results 
Fontes defeated Finchem in the general election with 52.4% of votes.

Attorney General 

Incumbent Republican Attorney General Mark Brnovich was term-limited by the Arizona Constitution and unable to seek re-election. He was re-elected in 2018 with 51.7% of the vote.

The Republican nominee was Abraham Hamadeh.

Former commissioner Kristin Mayes ran in the Democratic primary unopposed.

Results 

The original round of vote counting ended on November 21, with Mayes having 511 more votes than Hamadeh in unofficial results, within the 0.5% margin for an automatic recount. The results of the recount were announced on December 29, with Mayes having 280 more votes than Hamadeh.

State Treasurer 

Incumbent Republican State Treasurer Kimberly Yee originally announced her intentions to retire to run for governor. However, she later withdrew from that race to instead run for reelection. She was first elected in 2018 with 54.3% of the vote.

Corporate finance officer Bob Lettieri and state representative Jeff Weninger unsuccessfully challenged Yee in the Republican primary.

Democratic state senator Martín Quezada is the Democratic nominee.

Yee was successful, winning approximately 56% of the vote.

Superintendent of Public Instruction 

Incumbent Democratic Superintendent of Public Instruction Kathy Hoffman ran for re-election. She was first elected in 2018 with 51.6% of the vote.

Republicans nominated Tom Horne, former superintendent and former Arizona Attorney General, who defeated real estate manager Shiry Sapir, and state representative Michelle Udall.

Hoffman conceded defeat on November 17.

The original count of the election results had Horne winning by 8,967 votes; the recount results had Horne winning by 9,188 votes.

Results

State Mine Inspector 

Former Republican Mine Inspector Joe Hart was term-limited by the Arizona Constitution and unable to seek re-election. He was re-elected in 2018 with 51.7% of the vote. Hart resigned on October 31, 2021, and was replaced by Paul Marsh, who was immediately eligible to run for a full term. Marsh then ran un-opposed and was elected to a four-year term outright.

Trista di Genova was the Democratic write-in candidate.

Republican primary

Results

General election

Results

Corporation Commission 

Two of the five seats on the Corporation Commission were up for election, elected by plurality block voting. Incumbents Sandra Kennedy, a Democrat, and Justin Olson, a Republican, are eligible for re-election. However, Olson announced he is running for U.S. Senator.

Republicans Kevin Thompson and Nick Myers won the general election.

Republican primary

Candidates

Declared 
Nick Myers, policy advisor to commissioner Justin Olson
Kim Owens, Arizona Power Authority commissioner and candidate for the corporation commission in 2020
Kevin Thompson, Mesa city councillor

Declined 
Justin Olson, incumbent commissioner (running for U.S. Senate)

Polling

Endorsements

Results

Democratic primary

Declared 
Sandra Kennedy, incumbent commissioner
Lauren Kuby, Tempe city councillor

Endorsements

Results

General election

Results

State legislature 

All 90 seats in both chambers of the Arizona State Legislature were up for election in 2022. Republicans held small majorities in both chambers.

State Senate

House of Representatives

Supreme Court 
Supreme Court justices Ann Timmer, James Beene, and Bill Montgomery stood for retention. Justice Timmer was retained in 2016 with 76.7% of the vote. Justices Beene and Montgomery were both appointed in 2019.

Local elections 

Numerous local elections also took take place in 2022. Some notable ones include:
A special election for to elect the County Attorney for Maricopa County due to the resignation of Allister Adel.
A special election for District 2 on the Maricopa County Board of Supervisors to replace Steve Chucri.
The first competitive mayoral race in Chandler in 16 years.
Former Sheriff Joe Arpaio challenged Fountain Hills mayor Ginny Dickey
Four Phoenix City Council seats were up for election, including incumbent Jim Waring.
Three candidates ran for mayor of Flagstaff.

Ballot propositions

Certification 

14 of Arizona's 15 counties certified the voting results by the November 28, 2022 deadline; the exception was Cochise County. Despite no evidence of irregularities with vote counting, Cochise County's Republican officials delayed their certification vote to December 2, 2022, to accommodate a hearing on the certification of voting machines. Previously on November 21, Arizona's State Elections Director, Kori Lorick, had sent Cochise County officials confirmation that the Cochise County's voting machines had been certified by the United States Election Assistance Commission in an accredited laboratory. However, the county's Republican officials insisted on hearing more from those who had without evidence alleged that the voting machines were not properly certified. Cochise County election officials certified the county's voting results on December 1, after a court order was issued by Pima County Superior Court Judge Casey McGinley, who cited that by law, since Cochise County were no longer tabulating votes and had no missing votes, a certification vote needed to take place within 20 days of the election, which was November 28.

Lawsuits over results

Kari Lake's lawsuit 
Unsuccessful Republican gubernatorial candidate Kari Lake initiated a lawsuit on December 9 seeking a court order to either overturn Katie Hobbs' victory and declare Lake as the winner of the election, or redo the election in Maricopa County. On December 19, Maricopa County Superior Court Judge Peter Thompson dismissed eight of ten counts of Lake's lawsuit, regarding invalid signatures on mail-in ballots, incorrect certification, inadequate remedy, as well as violations of freedom of speech, equal protection, due process, the secrecy clause, and constitutional rights. Judge Thompson allowed the remaining two counts to go to trial, these being allegations that election officials intentionally interfered with Maricopa County ballot printers and with the chain of custody of Maricopa County ballots; Judge Thompson ruled that Lake needed to prove the allegations and that the alleged actions "did in fact result in a changed outcome" of the election. After the trial occurred on December 21 and December 22, Judge Thompson dismissed Lake's remaining case on December 24, as the court did not find clear and convincing evidence that misconduct was committed. Judge Thompson wrote: "Every single witness before the Court disclaimed any personal knowledge of such [intentional] misconduct. The Court cannot accept speculation or conjecture in place of clear and convincing evidence". 

Lake appealed on December 27 to the Arizona Court of Appeals against Judge Thompson's rulings. Lake also attempted to have the lawsuit transferred before the Arizona Supreme Court, but the Arizona Supreme Court rejected this without prejudice on January 4, 2023, as "no good cause appears to transfer the matter to this court"; by this date, Hobbs had already assumed the position of Arizona Governor. On February 16, a three-judge panel for the Arizona Court of Appeals affirmed Thompson's ruling; chief judge Kent Cattani wrote the opinion and two other judges, Maria Elena Cruz and Peter Swann, concurred. The appeals court found that the evidence presented in court showed, contrary to Lake's claims, that "voters were able to cast their ballots, that votes were counted correctly and that no other basis justifies setting aside the election results".

Lake filed an appeal to the Arizona Supreme Court on March 1, 2023.

Sonny Borrelli's lawsuit 

Republican Arizona state senator Sonny Borrelli filed a lawsuit on December 12 to invalidate the results of the gubernatorial election won by Katie Hobbs. On December 16, Mohave County Superior Court Judge Lee Jantzen dismissed Borrelli's lawsuit as Borrelli's lawyers waited too long to provide service to the defendants, thus there was not enough time to conclude the lawsuit by the legal deadline for election challenges.

Mark Finchem's lawsuit 

Unsuccessful Republican Secretary of State candidate Mark Finchem filed a lawsuit on December 9 to have the election "nullified and redone". The lawsuit was dismissed with prejudice on December 16 by Maricopa County Superior Court judge Melissa Julian. Among other issues, Judge Julian rejected the merits of Finchem's arguments on voting machines certification and voting software certification, and separately concluded that Finchem "does not allege that any of the votes cast were actually illegal" and does not allege that any legal vote was not counted, but only alleged "suspicions that some votes may not have been counted", which was insufficient to overturn an election. Judge Julian also rejected Finchem's allegations of "misconduct" by Secretary of State Katie Hobbs as insufficient.

Judge Julian in March 2023 sanctioned Finchem and his lawyer to pay the legal fees of Fontes' campaign and office because Finchem's lawsuit was "groundless and not brought in good faith." The judge noted that a supposed expert called by Finchem asserted that there were "missing votes", but the number of "missing votes" claimed was not enough to change the result of the election. The judge cited Finchem's decision not to inspect ballots as indicating that Finchem "had no expectation that an inspection would yield a favorable outcome", which further "demonstrates that Finchem challenged his election loss despite knowing that his claims regarding misconduct and procedural irregularities were insufficient under the law to sustain the contest." Finchem reacted to the sanctions by calling for Judge Julian to be "removed from the bench for her abuse of judicial authority".

Abe Hamadeh's lawsuits 

Republican candidate for Attorney General, Abe Hamadeh, filed a lawsuit on November 22 in an attempt to be declared the winner, despite his opponent Kris Mayes having more votes at the time; Maricopa County Superior Court Judge Randall Warner dismissed the lawsuit without prejudice on November 29, ruling that it was premature because Arizona had yet to certify the election and declare election results.

While awaiting a recount for the election due to the close result, Hamadeh, who was behind in the original count, initiated a lawsuit on December 9 "to ensure that all lawfully cast votes are properly counted and that unlawfully cast votes are not counted". Mohave County Superior Court Judge Lee Jantzen noted that Hamadeh's lawsuit was different from others because Hamadeh "is not alleging political motives or fraud or personal agendas being pushed", but "is simply alleging misconduct by mistake, or omission by election officials, led to erroneous count of votes and which if true could have led to an uncertain result" of the election. Judge Jantzen on December 20 dismissed one count of the lawsuit alleging that Hamadeh's unverified early ballots were illegal votes. The rest of the lawsuit was regarding wrongful disqualification of provisional and early ballots, wrongful exclusion of provisional voters, inaccurate ballot duplications, and inaccurate ballot adjudications; Judge Jantzen denied the remainder of Hamadeh's election challenge on December 23 at the end of a three-hour evidentiary hearing, stating that there was an absence of "even slight information" that "the election was done illegally or incorrectly".

Hamadeh filed another lawsuit regarding the election result on January 4, 2023, after Mayes had already been sworn in as attorney general; the new lawsuit cited that the "recount results identified significant, material discrepancies" which were not known to the court during the previous lawsuit.

Notes

References

External links 
 Candidates at Ballotpedia
 Candidates at Vote Smart

 
Arizona